The Seven Dwarfs or Dwarves are characters in the fairy tale "Snow White".

The term may also refer to:

Seven Dwarves (TV series), a British seven-part documentary reality television series
7 Dwarves – Men Alone in the Wood, a German 2004 comedy film
"The seven dwarves", a series of small defensive emplacements built between 1912 and 1916 as part of the fortifications of Metz